Kustaa Jalkanen (17 May 1862, Rautalampi – 23 April 1921) was a Finnish farmer and politician. He belonged to the Young Finnish Party. Jalkanen served as a Member of the Diet of Finland from 1904 to 1905 and as a Member of the Parliament of Finland from 1911 to 1913.

References

1862 births
1921 deaths
People from Rautalampi
People from Kuopio Province (Grand Duchy of Finland)
Young Finnish Party politicians
Members of the Diet of Finland
Members of the Parliament of Finland (1911–13)